David Walker Boyle (24 April 1929 – 16 November 2009) was an English professional footballer who played as an inside forward for Newcastle United, Berwick Rangers, Barnsley, Crewe Alexandra, Chesterfield, Bradford City, Scarborough and Bacup Borough.

References

1929 births
2009 deaths
English footballers
Newcastle United F.C. players
Berwick Rangers F.C. players
Barnsley F.C. players
Crewe Alexandra F.C. players
Chesterfield F.C. players
Bradford City A.F.C. players
Scarborough F.C. players
Bacup Borough F.C. players
English Football League players
Association football inside forwards